Gina Holden (born March 17, 1975) is a Canadian actress. She is known for her roles as Coreen Fennel in Blood Ties, Dale Arden in Flash Gordon, and Shea Allen in Harper's Island.

Early life 
Holden was born on March 17, 1975, in Smithers, British Columbia, Canada. She has done modeling and lived in Japan.

Acting career
She starred as Dale Arden in the Flash Gordon series, as Coreen Fennel in Blood Ties, and as Shea Allen in the CBS thriller series Harper's Island. She has also guest starred in shows including The CW series Life Unexpected. Aside from appearing in Final Destination 3 and Aliens vs. Predator: Requiem, Holden portrayed Joyce Dagen in 2010's Saw 3D.

Personal life
Holden has a son, born in 2017.

Filmography

Film

Television

References

External links

 Official website
 
 

1975 births
Actresses from British Columbia
Canadian film actresses
Canadian television actresses
Living people
People from Smithers, British Columbia
21st-century Canadian actresses
Canadian expatriates in Japan
Canadian expatriates in the United States